Srirangapur also known as Sri Rangapuram is a village and a mandal in Wanaparthy district in the state of Telangana, India. Srirangapur is about 10 km from Pebber and 25 km from Wanaparthy

History 
India's oldest temples was built by Rajas of Wanaparthy Samsthanam in the 18th century in Sri Rangapur ancient Hindu temple Sri Ranganayaka Swamy Temple there is under pass to gadawal from ranganayaka temple.

Villages 
The villages in Madanapur mandal include:

 Srirangapur
 Thatipamula 
 Nagarala
 Kamballapur
 Venkatapur 
 Nagasanipalle 
 sherupally
 Janampeta

References 

Mandals in Wanaparthy district
Census towns in Wanaparthy district
Wanaparthy district